The Montezuma Well springsnail (Pyrgulopsis montezumensis) is a species of freshwater snail in the family Hydrobiidae, the mud snails. It is endemic to Montezuma Well, a large sinkhole in Yavapai County, Arizona, in the United States.

This snail has an ovate shell measuring no more than 2.7 millimeters tall. The tip of the snout is pigmented. The species is sexually dimorphic.

This aquatic snail lives in springs with substrates of travertine limestone. It is limited to Montezuma Well and the first 100 meters of its outflow. The snail has a preference for areas of the spring with bare limestone and no vegetation or sediment. It tolerates relatively high amounts of dissolved carbon dioxide and remains in areas of the springs where the CO2 concentration is high, possibly as a means of avoiding predators that cannot tolerate these conditions.

References

External links
NatureServe. 2014. Pyrgulopsis montezumensis. NatureServe Explorer. Version 7.1. Accessed September 12, 2014.

Pyrgulopsis
Yavapai County, Arizona
Endemic fauna of Arizona
Gastropods described in 1988
Taxonomy articles created by Polbot
Molluscs of the United States